Margarida Corceiro, better known as Magui Corceiro (born October 26, 2002), is a Portuguese actress, influencer and model.

Biography 

She made her TV debut in 2019, in the TVI production Prisioneira. Since 2020 she has starred in Bem me Quer, also from TVI.

In 2019 she began dating football player João Félix.

In 2020 she joined the 5th edition of the Portuguese version of Dancing with the Stars.

Filmography

Television

References

External links
 

2002 births
Living people
Portuguese film actresses
Association footballers' wives and girlfriends